Rao Chandrasen Rathore  was a Rathore ruler of Marwar (in the present day Rajasthan state of India). He was a younger son of Rao Maldev Rathore. Chandrasen followed his father's policy and stayed hostile to the ruling foreign powers in India. He is also known as Pratap of Marwar. He defended his kingdom for nearly two decades against relentless attacks from the Mughal Empire.

Early life 
Born on 30 July 1541, Chandrasen was the son of Rao Maldeo, Raja of Marwar. He was also the younger brother of Udai Singh, his successor.

Maldeo named him his successor, putting aside the claims of his older brothers, Ram and Udai Singh. This led to an eternal rivalry between Chandrasen and Udai Singh.

Reign 
On the death of Rao Maldeo, Chandrasen ascended the gadi (throne) of Marwar.

Although there was no law of Primogeniture present, rarely had the rights of the older child been put aside. This led to feud between Chandrasen and his brothers.

In 1562, Ramchandra, Udai Singh and Raimal rebelled at Sojat, Gangani and Dunda respectively. When Chandrasen had sent army to subdue them, Ramchandra and Raimal fled the battlefield without facing him.

In December 1562, Chandrasen fought Udai Singh and defeated him in Lohawat. In this battle, both sides suffered great loses in men and material. Udai Singh had given a blow with an axe to Chandrasen, and he also received a blow from Rawal Megh Raj, an ally of Chandrasen.

Chandrasen then fought Ramchandra at Nadol in 1563 and when Ramchandra saw no chance of his success, he fled to Nagore. Akbar took advantage of these internal disputes, and with the help of the rajas of Bikaner and Amer, fought Chandrasen in several battles.

In 1564, Hussain Quli Khan-i-Jahan invaded and captured the fort of Jodhpur. Chandrasen was then forced to retreat to Bhadrajun. Chandrasen Rathore continued to defy Mughal suzerainty by attacking the imperial forces every now and then. He also succeeded in establishing himself in the northern part of Marwar. However, he failed to consolidate his position and lost both men and material. The initial six years of his exile seems to be the hardest and he was forced to sell his family's heirlooms in order to continue his struggle.

In November 1570, Chandrasen had come from Bhadrajun to attend the Mughal Court in Nagore. Udai Singh had also come to this court from Phalodi. It seems both the brothers had come to the court with the intention of getting Jodhpur back. But Chandrasen, however, left the court soon after his arrival but left his son, Raisingh, there. It seems Chandrasen had left the court as he realised he could not get Jodhpur back by Royal favours. Also it appears that the Udai Singh had managed to get Royal favours and also his presence may have soured the atmosphere for Chandrasen.

Akbar who felt the stay of Raisingh could not fulfill his purpose had the fort of Bhadrajun was put to siege and captured in 1571. Chandrasen escaped to fort of Siwana . The same year Rao Chandrasen was welcomed by Rana Udai Singh II of Mewar and his daughter was married to the Rao. After the matrimonial alliance Chandrasen attacked several Mughal outposts with renewed vigour. The situation however changed after Rana Udai Singh's death in 1572. Rana Pratap, who succeeded to the throne, refused to help Chandrasen as he was himself faced with many problems. Disappointed by these developments Chandrasen left Mewar.

In 1575 a powerful Mughal operation was launched against Chandrasen under Shah Quli Khan, Rai Singh, Keshav Das and Shahbaz Khan.

In 1576 the powerful fort of Siwana which served as Chandrasen's capital was captured by the Mughals.

Akbar then had sent Jalal Khan to capture Chandrasen. But in the hot pursuit of Chandrasen, Jalal Khan lost his life. It seems the garrison used by Chandrasen at Siwana were sufficiently secured as could not be dislodged by the strenuous efforts put by Jalal Khan and other. He had also put a troop of faithful Rathors of Durana.

Finally in his 21st regnal year, Akbar had decided to put an end to the thing and sent a strong force under Mir Bakshi Shahbaz Khan. Shahbaz Khan had managed to reduce the fort of Duran and attack Siwana. By the end of March 1576, the fort of Siwana had fallen and left Chandrasen as a homeless wanderer.

At the request of his Sardars, he then proceeded to the hills of Piplod. During this time, Rawal Har Rai of Jaisalmer attacked and captured the fort of Porkaran for the Mughals.
Chandrasen made attempts to ask Rawal Askaran of Dungarpur for help. However, Askaran had already submitted to the Mughals and refused. Chandrasen was forced to move from one place to another. Rawal Askaran informed of these events to the Mughal emperor who appointed Payanda Khan and Sayyid Qasim to punish Chandrasen (1580). Chandrasen by this time was left with just a few hundred loyal companions and was unable to face the imperial army. He was forced to retreat to the mountain defiles of Sarand

Chandrasen made Sojat his capital and rallied his clansmen, he used the hills of Sarand to continue his war against the Mughal empire.

Death and aftermath 
Chandrasen continued his struggle until his death on 11 January 1581 at Siriari Pass. He was cremated at Saran, where his memorial stone is present. After his death, Marwar was brought under direct Mughal administration until Akbar restored the throne of Marwar to his older full-brother, Udai Singh in August 1583.

References

External links 

Monarchs of Marwar
Rajput rulers
Rathores
History of Rajasthan
1541 births
1581 deaths